Ishvaratva in Sanskrit language is an abstract noun meaning 'godhood', it also means divinity.

Purushottama (the Lord) conceals and also manifests the qualities at His will, He conceals his qualities like Ananda ('bliss') and Ishvaratva ('Lordship') in the Jivas ('Individual Souls') and also conceals His quality of Consciousness in this material world.

The Chidabhasa which constitutes Ishvaratva is almost an exact likeness of true consciousness on account of its being associated with Prakrti in equilibrium and consequently unperturbed by the gunas in action. He is Saguna Brahman whilst true consciousness is Nirguna Brahman.

Ishvaratva is only from the standpoint of Jivatva. Both, Ishvaratva and Jivatva, are the apparent modifications of the Atman or Brahman. Though of mutually opposed qualities they are denoted by word tvam, the Atman as qualified by the mental states such as 'waking', 'dream' and 'dreamless sleep. The Mahavakya, Tat Tvam Asi affirms the identity between Brahman, Jiva and Ishvara  (Vivekachudamani 243-244).

Self-luminosity means being directly cognizable without dependence on anything else; and being different from that is hetu ('proximal or concomitant cause'). The assumed difference between Brahman that is cognized and the Brahman that cognizes is imaginary (kalpanika) because in reality there is no difference. The assumed difference between Brahman on the one hand and Jiva and Ishvara on the other is not based on luminosity but on other dharmas (jivatva and ishvaratva) (Advaita-siddhi 22-23).Ishvaratva is due to the Upadhi of Avidya. By the Upadhis that are avidyatmaka, attatvika and kalpanika'' by creating divisions in the divisionless and partless Brahman when in reality no divisions whatsoever exist. Sankara in his Bhashya on Brahma Sutra 2.1.14 explains that name and form constitute the seeds of the entire expanse of phenomenal existence, and which are conjured up by nescience. The omniscient God i.e. Brahman, who diversifies the seed (Shvetashvatara Upanishad VI.12), who manifests names and forms (Chandogya Upanishad VI.iii.2) and creates all forms, gives them names (and entering into them) (Taittirya Aranyaka III.xii.7), is different from them.

The sage of the Mandukya Upanishad partitioning the symbol Aum in three different morae adds a fourth mora-less part corresponding to which there are three different states of consciousness, corresponding to which, again, are different kinds of soul and posits  "the four states of consciousness – wakefulness, the dream, sleep and a fourth name-less state of consciousness (turiya) while teaching that there is an aspect of the Godhead corresponding to these states of consciousness, the last alone being ultimately real. The Absolute of philosophy surpasses even such a theological conception as that of God." It is only to those who regard the Universal Being as immanent in their own Selves, to them belongs eternal happiness, to no one else (Shvetashvatara Upanishad VI.12).

References

Hindu philosophical concepts
Vedanta
Sanskrit words and phrases